Ingersoll  may refer to:

People 
Ingersoll (surname)
Ingersoll Lockwood (1841–1918), American lawyer and writer

Places

Canada
 Ingersoll, Ontario

United States
 Ingersoll, Oklahoma
 Ingersoll, Wisconsin
 Ingersoll Township, Michigan
 Ingersoll Schoolhouse, Butte County, South Dakota

Other uses 
The Ingersoll Lectures on Human Immortality, lecture series at Harvard founded by a bequest from Caroline Haskell Ingersoll in memory of her father, George Goldthwait Ingersoll
 Ingersoll Rand, industrial firm founded by Simon Ingersoll and two Rand brothers
 Ingersoll Tile Elevator, in Ingersoll, Oklahoma
 USS Ingersoll, ships named Ingersoll in the United States Navy
 SS Jared Ingersoll, a World War II Liberty ship
 Ingersoll Watch Company, New York, produced the "Yankee" watch known as "The Watch that Made the Dollar Famous"
 Ingersoll Cutting tools, subsidiary of IMC, a part of Berkshire Hathaway

See also 
 Ingersoll's Luna Park - see Luna Park